The Focus Daily News is a daily newspaper published in DeSoto, Texas, covering Dallas County. It is locally owned and operated by Focus Newspapers of DFW. The newspaper is published on Tuesday, Wednesday, Thursday, Friday, and Sunday. Digital subscriptions of the print version are available.

Focus Daily News is the official newspaper of record for DeSoto, Duncanville, Cedar Hill, Lancaster, Hutchins, and Glenn Heights, Texas. The newspaper is dedicated to the southern suburbs of the Dallas/Ft. Worth metroplex. It publishes a combination of local, state, and national news and opinions. It also covers high=school sports, local school news, community events, automotive reviews, travel stories, and legal notices affecting residents.

The newspaper has a daily circulation of 28,065 and a Sunday circulation of 36,297 as of 2012. Focus Daily News is the largest circulation suburban daily newspaper in Texas.

References

External links
 Focus Daily News

Focus Daily News
DeSoto, Texas